The following is a list of the 177 communes of the Maine-et-Loire department of France.

The communes cooperate in the following intercommunalities (as of 2020):
CU Angers Loire Métropole
CA Agglomération du Choletais
CA Mauges Communauté
Communauté d'agglomération Saumur Val de Loire
CC Anjou Bleu Communauté
Communauté de communes Anjou Loir et Sarthe
Communauté de communes Baugeois Vallée
Communauté de communes Loire Layon Aubance
Communauté de communes des Vallées du Haut-Anjou

References

Maine-et-Loire